Teina Clark (born 27 October 1988) is a New Zealand-born Australian rugby league footballer who plays for the Wentworthville Magpies in the NSWRL Women's Premiership. 

She is an Australian and New South Wales representative and played for the St George Illawarra Dragons in the NRL Women's Premiership.

Playing career
Born in Ngaruawahia, New Zealand, Clark played her junior rugby league for Turangawaewae before moving to Australia.

In 2006, Clark made her debut for New South Wales. In 2007, she made her debut for Australia. In 2008, she represented Australia at the World Cup.

In 2013, Clark switched her international allegiance to her native New Zealand and was selected in the Kiwi Ferns squad for the 2013 Women's Rugby League World Cup. 24 hours before flying to England for the tournament, Clark was suspended by the NSWRL for six months after an incident with former professional boxer Lauryn Eagle during a club match in the Illawarra competition.

In 2014, she returned to rugby league with the Canley Heights Dragons and was selected to represent New South Wales.

In 2018, she joined the St George Illawarra Dragons for the inaugural NRL Women's Premiership season, playing three games. In May 2019, she represented NSW City at the Women's National Championships.

In 2019, she joined the Wentworthville Magpies in the NSWRL Women's Premiership.

References

External links
NSWRL profile

1988 births
Living people
New Zealand Māori rugby league players
New Zealand female rugby league players
Australia women's national rugby league team players
Rugby league props
St. George Illawarra Dragons (NRLW) players